The 2007–08 HockeyAllsvenskan season was the third season of the HockeyAllsvenskan, the second level of ice hockey in Sweden. 16 teams participated in the league, and the top four qualified for the Kvalserien, with the opportunity to be promoted to the Elitserien.

Participating teams

Regular season

*Nyköpings HK was relegated to Division 1 due to no elite license. Huddinge IK took their spot for the following HockeyAllsvenskan season. 
**Hammarby IF chose not to participate in the relegation round due to their financial situation. The club later went bankrupt in April 2008.

Playoffs

First round
 Borås HC - IF Björklöven 2:0 (4:1, 3:2 OT)
 Växjö Lakers Hockey - VIK Västerås HK 1:2 (3:6, 3:1, 1:4)

Second round
 Borås HC - VIK Västerås HK 0:2 (2:3 OT, 1:4)

Kvalserien

Relegation round

*Nyköpings HK was relegated to Division 1 due to no elite license. Huddinge IK took their spot for the following HockeyAllsvenskan season.

External links

 Season on hockeyarchives.info

Swe
HockeyAllsvenskan seasons
2007–08 in Swedish ice hockey leagues